Kluchevka is a rural locality (a village) in Semenkinsky Selsoviet, Belebeyevsky District, Bashkortostan, Russia. The population was 21 as of 2010. There are 2 streets.

Geography 
Kluchevka is located 32 km northeast of Belebey (the district's administrative centre) by road. Gusarkino is the nearest rural locality.

References 

Rural localities in Belebeyevsky District